USS Jack W. Wilke (DE-800) was a Buckley-class destroyer escort of the United States Navy.

Namesake
Jack Winton Wilke was born on 13 June 1919 in Covina, California. He enlisted in the United States Naval Reserve on 13 January 1941. After undergoing flight training, he was commissioned Ensign on 1 November 1941. Wilke was first assigned to a patrol squadron, but later reported to Torpedo Squadron 8 (VT-8) on board  in the Pacific.

In the Battle of Midway, 4 and 5 June 1942, he joined his squadron in attacking the Imperial Japanese Navy invasion force without fighter cover. All the planes and all the flyers but one, Ens. George H. Gay, of the squadron were lost; but their attack had diverted Japanese fighters from dive bombing attacks which might otherwise have prevented the eventual U.S. Navy victory. He was posthumously awarded the Navy Cross.

Construction and commissioning
Jack W. Wilke was launched by Consolidated Steel Corp., Orange, Texas, 18 December 1943; sponsored by Mrs. Joe H. Wilke, mother of Ens. Wilke; and commissioned 7 March 1944.

After a shakedown to the West Indies and antisubmarine warfare (ASW) training at Bermuda, Jack W. Wilke spent six months on Atlantic convoy escort duty. The escort covered several convoys from American ports to the Mediterranean in the summer of 1944, making stops at Oran, Algeria; Bizerte, Tunis; Palermo, Sicily; and Naples, Italy. Later in the year, the warship escorted a convoy directly to Cherbourg, France. That last convoy escort mission was particularly nerve-racking owing to the late war German U-boat offensive in British waters. Following intelligence indications that next generation U-boats were planning to return to the western Atlantic, Wilke operated with a hunter-killer group in the Newfoundland–Nova Scotia area from December 1944 to May 1945. Upon the surrender of Germany, she moved to Norfolk to serve as a weather reporting and air-sea rescue vessel.

Jack W. Wilke sailed 4 June 1945 for Miami and operated as a sonar training ship there until 18 July. The warship then shifted to Philadelphia for an overhaul (and the installation of more anti-aircraft guns and improved sonar gear) in preparation for operations in the Pacific. With that mission cancelled by the end of the war in August 1945, the escort sailed to Port Everglades, Florida for three weeks of experimental ASW exercises. 
In September, she underwent a three-month overhaul at New York Navy Yard in preparation for her new role as an experimental antisubmarine ship.
Jack W. Wilke sailed back to Florida on 7 January 1946 to commence operations out of Key West. During the years that followed, she carried out experiments in both tactics and sound equipment off Key West and during occasional cruises in the West Indies.

The ship's schedule of experimental operations was interrupted on New Year's Day 1959 by the triumph of Fidel Castro's forces in Cuba; and Jack W. Wilke steamed to Havana with other ships to help stabilize the situation and to protect American lives and property. During the remainder of the year, she operated off Key West and Norfolk on training operations, and took part in a special good-will cruise to Panama in October during a Caribbean training period.

Returning to Key West, the ship decommissioned 24 May 1960, and entered the Atlantic Reserve Fleet at Philadelphia. The old escort was struck from the Navy list on 1 August 1972 and later sold for scrap to Union Metals & Alloys Corp., New York, on 4 March 1974.

References

External links 
 history.navy.mil: USS Jack W. Wilke(revised 3 November 2005) 
     navsource.org: USS Jack W. Wilke
  hazegray.org: USS Jack W. Wilke

Buckley-class destroyer escorts
Ships built in Orange, Texas
1943 ships